Yuleba railway station is located on the Western line in Queensland, Australia. It serves the town of Yuleba. The original station had one platform, opening in 1879.

The Original Station was replaced by the Present structure in 2008 and has subsequently found a new home with the DownsSteam Tourist Railway & Museum.

Yuleba is served by Queensland Rail Travel's twice weekly Westlander service travelling between Brisbane and Charleville. 

Passengers heading for Wallumbilla Railway Station are required to alight from the Westlander here for onward road transport to Wallumbilla.

References

External links

Yuleba station Queensland's Railways on the Internet

Maranoa Region
Railway stations in Australia opened in 1879
Regional railway stations in Queensland
Western railway line, Queensland